Norman Theodoor Augustinus, Jr is an American writer.

Early life
Augustinus was born in the Hutzel Women's Hospital in Detroit, Michigan. He is the son of Levontina Melnyk and Norman Augustinus, Sr.  His grandfather Bart Theodoor Augustinus was born in Amsterdam, but left the Netherlands in 1922 entering the US by way of the Vermont, St. Albans Canadian Crossing.  Augustinus never met his biological father, but at the age of ten his mother remarried.  Augustinus credits his stepfather for much of his success. Augustinus's mother gave birth to twins but the other child was stillborn.

Biography
Known widely for writing humor, Augustinus studied Journalism and Communications at Ferris State University in Big Rapids, Michigan where he was an editor of the university newspaper the (Ferris Torch) and writer/producer of the then popular radio show, The Adventures of E-Man.  While a freshman at Ferris State University Augustinus published LEONARD. During his senior year at Ferris State University Augustinus placed in an invention contest and won a cash award for a mailbox transmitter device. A certificate and cash prize was presented to Augustinus during the dedication and open house of the Manufacturing Resource and Productivity Center.

An inventor, his gadgets have been featured in numerous publications and television shows.

Augustinus' highly viewed 'iPhone Colon Exam' invention/video was an inspiration to Patrick O'Neil the inventor of the iPhone olloclip which has sold over 75 million units worldwide.  Augustinus is cited in the olloclip US patent.

He has been a copywriter, run for political office hunted for treasure, appeared in over three dozen television commercials, and worked toward a private pilot license.  In 1991 Augustinus developed the story-line and dialogue for place mats used in over 300 McDonald's restaurants throughout Michigan, The Adventures of Tizzie Bean.  Additionally, Augustinus landed a bit part (under five lines) in the movie Hoffa starring Jack Nicholson (Shot in Cobo Hall Arena, Detroit).  Augustinus is listed in the 2003 & 2004 Edition of Marquis Who's Who in America and was nominated for the Ferris State University Distinguished Alumni Award two consecutive years in a row. In 1999 he was accepted into the prestigious Powerhouse Theatre Program at Vassar College in Poughkeepsie, New York.  He has written for newspapers and online publications such as McSweeney's Internet Tendency and he is a member of the Society of Professional Journalists, Screen Actor's Guild/American Federation of Television and Radio Artists (SAG - AFTRA) and Actors' Equity (AEA).

In March 2013 Roll Call and a dozen other publications worldwide, published a story about an animated cartoon Augustinus created and posted on his website with regards to the Obama administration.  The cartoon depicted several high ranking members of the Obama administration being laser beamed into nonexistence by a drone. The cartoon prompted a visit from the United States Secret Service. Highly controversial, the cartoon was viewed over 11 million times, and made Augustinus the first cartoonist in the United States to be investigated by a government agency because of a cartoon.

In 2014 and 2015 Augustinus stood in Columbus Circle Manhattan for hundreds of hours holding large, creatively worded banners in support of the New York City horse carriage industry, which de Blasio vowed to end immediately upon being elected NYC mayor. Augustinus was thanked by the Teamsters for his support in a full page notice/ad published in the New York Daily News on January 1, 2016.

Internet
Augustinus is one of the earliest podcasters.  In 1992 he broadcast his offbeat stories and poems (via the internet) using large uncompressed wav (wave) files.  In 1995 Augustinus began using RealAudio due largely to the dramatic increase in speed, eventually shifting his focus to the mp3 format and Podcasting in late 2004.  During 2006 comical bits produced by Augustinus were broadcast weekly on Sirius Satellite Radio.

Influences
His stepfather was a seasoned storyteller and involved with the Tool & Die industry in Detroit and (as a boy) Augustinus often accompanied him when calling on clients.  According to Augustinus, it was during these times that he "learned how to tell a story."

Personal life
In 2012 his sister Sandra committed suicide after being diagnosed with bone cancer after being treated for breast cancer.  Augustinus writes daily and performs his popular stand-up comedy routine regularly.  His novel, 'Cats and Dogs' was an Amazon Humor Best Seller (#8), in February 2013. His novel 'Bedbadger' was released January 21, 2013 and was also featured on the Amazon Humor Best Seller list.

On August 26, 2015 while driving through Michigan, Augustinus saw a Jeep Cherokee lose control and roll over several times off I-75. Augustinus ran to the car and pulled two children from the smoking, overturned vehicle. On October 9, 2015, Augustinus was nominated for the prestigious Carnegie Hero Medal.

References

External links
McSweeney's The Great Pumpkin
Detroit Free Press Sunday Magazine Article
Detroit Free Press Cult Icon
Detroit Free Press Article Norm Augustinus Science Fair
Detroit Free Press Article 'Line is Fine Between Oddball and True Genius' by Rick Ratliff
Village Voice 'A Chat with Norm Augustinus' by Anna Merlan
MLive 'Man Pulls Kids Out of SUV That Flips On I-75 in Bay County'
New York Daily News 'NYC Man Pulls Kids From Flipped SUV On Michigan Interstate'
Reference 23 Non-Patent Citations Optical Component (olloclip) US D763340 S1
'Thank You From The Original Teamsters of New York' January 1, 2016 New York Daily News
'Satirist Spooked By Would-Be Watchdog' 2013 Roll Call
'Augustinus 2013 Drone Cartoon' Norm Augustinus Drone Cartoon

American satirists
American short story writers
American podcasters
Year of birth missing (living people)
Living people
Ferris State University alumni
Writers from Detroit
People from Warren, Michigan
Articles containing video clips
Comedians from Michigan
American people of Dutch descent
Vassar College alumni